Mart Ristl (born 7 July 1996) is a German footballer who plays as a midfielder for FC 08 Homburg.

Club career
Ristl was promoted to the first team of VfB Stuttgart for the 2015–16 season. On 31 July 2015 he made his professional debut for VfB Stuttgart II in the 3. Liga against SC Preußen Münster. Ristl made his first Bundesliga appearance on 24 October 2015 against Bayer 04 Leverkusen.

On 30 August 2017, Ristl moved to Ligue 2 side FC Sochaux-Montbéliard.

International career
He was the team captain of Germany during the 2015 UEFA European Under-19 Championship qualification.

References

External links
 
 
 VfB.de profile
 

1996 births
Living people
Association football midfielders
German footballers
Footballers from Baden-Württemberg
Germany youth international footballers
VfB Stuttgart players
VfB Stuttgart II players
FC Sochaux-Montbéliard players
VfR Aalen players
FC Viktoria Köln players
FC 08 Homburg players
Bundesliga players
3. Liga players
Ligue 2 players
Regionalliga players
German expatriate footballers
Expatriate footballers in France
German expatriate sportspeople in France